James Lally, Irish soldier and Jacobite, died 1691.

Lally (also O'Mullally) (died 1691) was an Irish landowner and politician from Tuam, County Galway. He was a leading member of the Gaelic clan of the O'Mullallys (in Irish Ó Maolalaidh), which was based in the parish of Tuam, County Galway. Their lands comprised the lands known as Tulach na Dála (Anglicised as Tullindaly, Tullenadaly, Tullaghnadaly, or Tolendal), four miles north of Tuam town.

The eldest of five brothers, he was the son of Thomas Lally and Jane Dillon, sister of Theobald Dillon, 7th Viscount Dillon. Lally sat as representative of Tuam Borough in King James II's Patriot Parliament of 1689. After the Jacobite defeat, his lands were attained and he was declared an outlaw.

He went to France in 1690 with his cousin, the Honourable Colonel Arthur Dillon, in whose regiment, as Colonel-Commandant, he was killed at Montmélian in 1691. His brother, Gerald Lally, followed him to France and was father of Thomas Arthur Lally (1702–1766), Baron de Tollendal and Comte de Lally.

See also

 Seán Ó Maolalaidh, chief of the Name, fl. 1419–1480
 Conchobair Ó Maolalaidh, successively bishop of Clonfert (1447–1448), Emly (1448–1449) and Elphin (1449–1468).
 Tomás Ó Maolalaidh, Bishop of Clonmacnoise (c.1509–1514) and Archbishop of Tuam (1514–1536)
 Mick Lally, actor, (1945–2010)
 Michelle Lally, singer and musician

References

 A sept of O'Maolale (or Lally) of Hy-Maine, Jane Martyn, 	pp. 198–209, Journal of the Galway Archaeological and Historical Society;, 1905–6.
 History of O'Mullally and Lally clann, D.P. O'Mullally, Chicago, 1942.
 Lally, the Regime’s Scapegoat, Eoghan Ó hAnnrachain, Journal of the Galway Archaeological and Historical Society;, 2004.

Year of birth missing
1691 deaths
Members of the Parliament of Ireland (pre-1801) for County Galway constituencies
People from Tuam
Irish Jacobites
Irish soldiers in the French Army
Irish soldiers in the army of James II of England
Irish MPs 1689